Braggiotti is a surname. Notable people with the surname include: 

Enrico Braggiotti (born 1923), Turkish-born Monegasque banker
Francesca Braggiotti (1902–1998), Italian dancer, actress, and first lady of Connecticut, US
Gerardo Braggiotti, Italian banker
Gloria Braggiotti Etting (1909–2003), Italian dancer
Mario Braggiotti (1905–1996), American pianist